ZACH Theatre (the Zachary Scott Theatre Center) is a professional theatre company located in Austin, Texas, as well as its associated complex of theatre facilities. The company is the oldest continuously active theatre company in Texas, and one of the ten oldest in the country.

Offerings and facilities
The theatre operates year-round, serving more than 100,000 patrons annually, with more than 500 performances including plays, musicals, original works, and theatre for youth. ZACH also provides education programs that are utilized by thousands of children throughout central Texas.

The theatre complex, located on the south shore of Lady Bird Lake, includes three stages, several event spaces, and numerous classrooms and offices. Some of the theatre's facilities are made available for private rental, including the three stages. Costumes and props are also available for rental.

History
The theatre originally opened in 1932 as the Austin Little Theater. Sometime later, it became known as the "Austin Civic Theater."  The company's name was changed to the Zachary Scott Theatre Center in 1968 to honor Austin native and film star Zachary Scott. Since then, it has been rebranded to be titled ZACH Theatre.

In 1972, the 230-seat Kleberg Theatre was built, and in 1990 a 135-seat theatre-in-the-round called the Whisenhunt Theatre was added. In 2006, the city of Austin passed a bond issue which included $10 million to fund a new theatre for ZACH, resulting in the construction of the 420-seat Topfer Theatre in 2011.

Production history
A complete list of ZACH Theatre productions beginning in 1995 is shown below.

2021-2022 Season

 Into the Woods 
 A Christmas Carol 
 Cat in the Hat (Theatre for Families)
 The Elaborate Entrance of Chad Deity 
 Somebody Loves You, Mr. Hatch (Theatre for Families)
 Reunion '85
 The Sound of Music 
 The Inheritance Part 1

2020-2021 Season

 Songs Under the Stars: A Socially-distanced Outdoor Concert Series 
 Disney Through the Decades 
 Rockabilly Kings 
 70s Female Rockstars
 Tameca Jones in Concert 
 Beatles Redux 
 Gospel Down by the Riverside 
 80's Dance Party 

2019-2020 Season 

 A Night with Janis Joplin 
 Every Brilliant Thing 
 Somebody Loves You, Mr. Hatch (Theatre for Families) 
 Songs Under the Stars: A Socially-distanced Outdoor Concert Series 
 On Broadway 
 70s Female Rockstars
 Motown Grooves 
 Superstar CHANEL
 A Rockin' Holiday Concert 

2018-2019 Season

 Once
A Christmas Carol
The Santaland Diaries
Hedwig and the Angry Inch
Notes from the Field
Matilda The Musical
The Ballad of Klook and Vinette*
Fire and Air
Tortoise & the Hare (Theatre for Families)
Holiday Heroes (TFF)
Wake Up, Brother Bear (TFF)

2017-2018 Season

 Singin’ in the Rain
 A Tuna Christmas
 A Christmas Carol
 The Curious Incident of the Dog in the Night-Time
 Sunday in the Park with George
 Heisenberg
 Disney's Beauty and the Beast
 The Lion, the Witch, and the Wardrobe (Theatre for Families)
 Holiday Heroes (TFF)
 Las Aventuras de Enoughie (TFF)
 Goodnight Moon (TFF)

2016-2017 Season

 Priscilla, Queen of the Desert
 A Christmas Carol
 The Santaland Diaries
 The Great Society
 Lady Day at Emerson's Bar and Grill
 In the Heights
 Million Dollar Quartet
 Elephant and Piggie: We are in a Play! (Theatre For Families)
 Charlotte's Web (TFF)
jj's arcade (TFF)

2015- 2016 Season

 Evita
 A Christmas Carol
 The Santaland Diaries
 Tribes
 ANN
 One Man, Two Guvnors
 Buyer & Cellar
 Mary Poppins
 James in the Giant Peach (Theatre For Families)
 Winnie the Pooh (TFF)
Alice in Wonderland (TFF)
Tomas and the Library Lady (TFF)

2014-2015 Season

 The King and I
 A Christmas Carol
 This Wonderful Life
 Peter and the Starcatcher
 All the Way
 Mothers and Sons
 Sophisticated Ladies
 Maid Marian in a Stolen Car*

2013-2014 Season
 Les Miserables by Claude-Michel Schonberg, Herbert Kretzmer  Topfer Theatre
 A Christmas Story by Joseph Robinette, Benj Pasek, Justin Paul  Topfer Theatre
 This Wonderful Life by Steve Murray  Whisenhunt Stage
 In the Next Room or the vibrator play by Sarah Ruhl  Topfer Theatre
 The Gospel at Colonus by Lee Breuer, Bob Telson  Topfer Theatre
 Vanya and Sonia and Masha and Spike by Christopher Durang  Topfer Theatre
 Maid Marian in a Stolen Car by Jaston Williams  Whisenhunt Stage
 The Who's Tommy by Pete Townshend, Des McAnuff  Topfer Theatre

2012—2013 Season
 Harvey by Mary Chase  05/23/13—06/16/13  Karen Kuykendall Stage
 Mad Beat Hip & Gone by Steven Dietz  04/11/13—04/28/13  Karen Kuykendall Stage
 33 Variations by Moisés Kaufman  01/31/13—02/17/13  Karen Kuykendall Stage
 Tru by Jay Presson Allen  01/17/13—03/10/13  Whisenhunt Stage
 White Christmas by Paul Blake, David Ives & Irving Berlin  12/13/12—12/30/12  Karen Kuykendall Stage
 The Santaland Diaries by David Sedaris, adapted by Joe Mantello  11/24/12—12/23/12  Whisenhunt Stage 
 Ragtime by Terrence McNally, Lynn Ahrens & Stephen Flaherty, adapted from the novel by E. L. Doctorow  10/25/12—11/18/12  Karen Kuykendall Stage
 Xanadu by Douglas Carter Beane, John Farrar & Jeff Lynne, adapted from the Universal Pictures film  09/01/12—11/11/12  Kleberg Stage
 Fully Committed by Becky Mode  09/01/12—09/30/12  Whisenhunt Stage

Awards
In 2012, ZACH got a $70,000 grant from the National Endowment for the Arts to produce the Terrence McNally musical Ragtime.

Each year The Austin Chronicle presents its 'Best of Austin' awards.  Awards given to ZACH beginning in 1993 are shown below.

References

Theatres in Texas
Theatre companies in Texas
Performing groups established in 1932
Culture of Austin, Texas
Regional theatre in the United States